The women's 50 metre freestyle event at the 2022 Commonwealth Games will be held on 30 and 31 July at the Sandwell Aquatics Centre.

Records
Prior to this competition, the existing world, Commonwealth and Games records were as follows:

Schedule
The schedule is as follows:

All times are British Summer Time (UTC+1)

Results

Heats

Semifinals

Final

References

Women's 50 metre freestyle
Commonwealth Games